The Baw Baw frog (Philoria frosti) is a critically endangered species of Australian frog as categorised on the IUCN Red List and listed under the Flora and Fauna Guarantee Act (1988).  It has suffered a decline in population, mostly due to infection caused by chytrid fungus.  Zoos Victoria has undertaken a breeding program to ensure survival of the species which commenced in 2010, and in October 2018 successfully collected the first eggs laid in captivity.

Taxonomy and etymology 
The species was described as Philoria frosti by Walter Baldwin Spencer in 1901, honouring Charles Frost, an Australian naturalist. The specimens used in the species description (type series) were provided by Frost, an amateur herpetologist, who recovered five individuals that had been regurgitated by a tiger snake Notechis scutatus.

Description 
Adults are dark brown and often have brown to dark brown, yellow flecked bellies. These frogs have a prominent parotoid gland behind each eye. Their toes are unwebbed. At hatching, the tadpoles are creamy white and unpigmented, acquiring some colouration and eye pigmentation as they mature. Tadpoles have large yolk sacs and residual mouths, and do not feed until metamorphosis. Metamorphlings have different colouration to the adults.

Declining population

Population estimates have reduced from 15,000 to 10,000 breeding males in 1983 to around 750, or according to Frogs Victoria less than 250 individuals.  The cause of this reduction is most likely due to chytridiomycosis caused by chytrid fungus, which can cause swift declines in an amphibian populations living in a pristine environment with no other explanation.

Captive breeding program

In order to save the frog from extinction, a self-sustaining captive breeding program was commenced, with Zoos Victoria taking the lead.  When the program was started in 2010 almost nothing was known about managing the frogs in captivity.

An artificial environment was created in a shipping container named "the Baw Baw Bunker" and the first eggs were collected from the wild in 2011 but were unviable.  In 2013, 96 metamorphs were raised from collected eggs.  Eleven females were captured from the wild in 2016 for the first time, and on 22 October 2018 the first eggs were laid in captivity.  Researchers planned to place the eggs on a chytrid fungus-free part of Mt Baw Baw within four weeks.

In November 2020, at which time it was estimated that about 1,000 of the frogs remained in the wild, 25 male and 25 female adult frogs were released with radio transmitters on their backs in various specially selected areas on Mt Baw Baw. Researchers hope that the release of the adult frogs, the first time this has been tried, would create a more robust population of the frogs more quickly than by releasing eggs alone.

See also
 IUCN Red List
 Chytridiomycosis

Notes

References

Further reading
 Tyler, M.  The Action Plan for Australian Frogs  Wildlife Australia, Cth. Department of the Envoronment and Heritage, April 1997
 Malone, B.S. (1985a). Status, distribution and ecology of the Baw Baw Frog (Philoria frosti). Arthur Rylah Institute Technical Report No. 36. Arthur Rylah Institute, Department of Conservation, Forests and Lands, Victoria, cited in Hollis, G.J. Baw Baw Frog (Philoria frosti) Recovery Plan 1997-2001 Department of Natural Resources and Environment, October 1997.This small Australian frog has been added to the endangered species list because of its population decline in the past years. In 1983 it was believed that there was between 10000 and 15000 Baw Baw frogs but now as little as 250 are thought to be left. They can be found in eastern Victoria's Baw Baw Plateau ( east of Melbourne) and Eucalyptus forests around that area. The adult frogs are very dark and have a lighter pigmented belly. The main characteristic of these frogs is the enlarged parotid glands behind the eyes. Their skin is covered in small warts which give them a prickly appearance.

External links 

 Frogs of Victoria field guide with description, images and sound recording
 Amphibiaweb
 Excellent, detailed description of species and conservation issues by Greg Hollis, Cth Department of the Environment and Heritage, October 1997
 http://www.edgeofexistence.org/amphibians/species_info.php?id=570
 Australian Government, Species Profile and Threats Database (SPRAT) Profile

Philoria
Frogs of Australia
Amphibians of Victoria (Australia)
Critically endangered fauna of Australia
Amphibians described in 1901
Taxa named by Walter Baldwin Spencer